LiAngelo Robert Ball (born November 24, 1998) is an American professional basketball player for the Greensboro Swarm of the NBA G League.  Ball played for Chino Hills High School in California, where he won a state championship and achieved national success as a junior with his brothers Lonzo, and LaMelo, who are both current NBA guards. A three-star recruit and UCLA signee, he decided to forgo college basketball after being suspended for shoplifting in China before the 2017–18 season. In turn, Ball signed with Lithuanian professional team Prienai. He later played in the Junior Basketball Association (JBA), a league founded by his father, before joining the G League at the end of 2019–20. He was briefly signed to the Detroit Pistons in late 2020, but was waived prior to the start of the 2020–21 season. Ball joined the Greensboro Swarm in 2021.

Ball and his brothers have attracted national attention since playing together in high school. His father, LaVar, also grew into a media personality in 2017. Ball has a signature shoe by his father's company, Big Baller Brand, and a role on his family's Facebook Watch reality show Ball in the Family.

Early life
Ball is the second son of LaVar and Tina (née Slatinsky) Ball, who are both former college basketball players. LaVar, who stands 6-foot-6 (1.98 m), played for Washington State and Cal State Los Angeles. Tina, who stands 6-feet (1.83 m), also played with the latter school. His father later played professional football as a tight end for the London Monarchs of the World League of American Football.

In his childhood, Ball often played basketball against older opponents, facing teams of fourth and fifth-graders while in kindergarten. He started working out and training by age four and first competed with both of his brothers, Lonzo and LaMelo, at age six. As a seven-year-old, he also began playing flag football with his brothers. While Lonzo was a quarterback, LiAngelo and LaMelo caught passes. On the basketball court, LiAngelo grew up playing with his brothers on Big Ballers VXT, an Amateur Athletic Union (AAU) under-17 team created by their father and coached by both parents.

High school career

Freshman and sophomore seasons
Ball played basketball for four years at Chino Hills High School in Chino Hills, California. As a freshman, he started alongside his older brother, Lonzo. Ball helped Chino Hills reach its first-ever CIF Southern Section Open Division championship game. Chino Hills fell in overtime to Centennial High School at the Southern California Regional Division I final. As a sophomore, Ball was teammates with his brother, Lonzo, and his cousin, Andre Ball. He suffered a foot injury before the season and missed a tournament at Fairfax High School in June 2014. On September 14, he scored 35 points with seven three-point field goals to win the Ron Massey Memorial Fall Hoops Classic. In December 2014, Ball scored 53 points in a 111–80 win over Dorsey High School. At the end of the season, Ball was sidelined for four games with an ankle sprain but returned for the playoffs. His team lost at the CIF State Division I championship game. After the season, on April 21, he verbally committed to play college basketball for UCLA.

Junior season
In his junior season, Ball played with both of his brothers, Lonzo and LaMelo. In December 2015, Ball scored 32 points to upset top-ranked Montverde Academy in the City of Palms Classic quarterfinals. He scored 40 points in a semifinal win over High Point Christian Academy and won the tournament. Against Jonesboro High School at the MaxPreps Holiday Classic, Ball scored 41 points. On February 11, he led all scorers with 32 points against Etiwanda High School, as Chino Hills finished the regular season with a 27–0 record. On March 5, 2016, he scored 31 points to win the CIF Southern Section Open Division title over Sierra Canyon School. On March 26, he had 18 points to win the Open Division title over De La Salle High School. As a junior, Ball averaged 27.4 points per game, which led his team. His team finished 35–0 and was named mythical national champion by MaxPreps, who also labeled their title run "perhaps the best brother act in high school basketball history."

Senior season
On November 29, Ball scored 56 points in a 121–89 win over Lutheran High School of Orange County. In his following game, which was played on the next day, Ball scored a career-high 72 points with 13 three-pointers in a 128–108 victory over Rancho Christian School, the tenth-most points scored in a single game in California high school history. On December 26, he scored 65 points in a Rancho Mirage Holiday Invitational win over Foothill High School. On January 20, 2017, Ball scored 60 points in a 136–93 win over Los Osos High School. Seven days later, he registered 52 points and 10 three-pointers in a victory against Damien High School. His team fell in the CIF Southern Section Open Division semifinals to Bishop Montgomery High School. After a 30–3 season, he was named All-Area Player of the Year by The San Bernardino Sun and Inland Valley Daily Bulletin. Ball was also a first-team All-State and honorable mention All-American selection by MaxPreps. In addition, he averaged 33.8 points per game as a senior, leading the state of California in scoring.

College career

Ball was a consensus three-star recruit. 247Sports.com ranked him outside of their top-200 recruits nationally and as the 50th best shooting guard in his class. Having already committed to play for the UCLA Bruins as a high school sophomore, Ball signed a letter of intent on November 2, 2016, and enrolled at the University of California, Los Angeles on June 1, 2017. He was projected to be a reserve for during his 2017–18 freshman season for UCLA. He played his only game with the Bruins in the preseason on November 1, 2017, against NCAA Division II team Cal State Los Angeles, scoring 11 points.

On November 7, 2017, days before UCLA's regular season opener against Georgia Tech in Shanghai, China, Ball and two other freshman teammates were arrested in Hangzhou for allegedly stealing sunglasses from a Louis Vuitton store at a high-end shopping center near their team hotel. The trio potentially faced a fine and three to ten years in prison but were soon released from custody after U.S. President Donald Trump intervened on Ball's behalf and secured his freedom.  Ball was suspended indefinitely from the UCLA basketball program. On December 4, he announced that he planned to withdraw from UCLA; his father LaVar had grown frustrated over the length of the suspension. Had Ball stayed at UCLA, he would have remained suspended for the rest of the season.

Professional career

Prienai (2018)
Although Ball was not considered a prospect at the time for the National Basketball Association (NBA), he planned on preparing for the 2018 draft with his father after leaving UCLA. On December 11, 2017, he signed with Prienai of the Lithuanian Basketball League (LKL), along with his younger brother LaMelo, who left Chino Hills before his junior season. The brothers' move to Lithuania was heavily reported by American sports media. Prienai withdrew from the Baltic Basketball League upon their arrival and took part in various exhibition games sponsored by his family's sports apparel company, Big Baller Brand.

In his professional debut on January 13, 2018, Ball went scoreless in a 95–86 loss to Lietkabelis. On February 11, he made his first start, recording 13 points in a 97–95 victory over Šiauliai. On March 25, Ball scored a season-high 28 points with six three-pointers in a loss to Nevėžis. On March 27, 2018, he announced that he would enter the 2018 NBA draft, even though most analysts believed that he was a long shot to be selected. On April 19, Ball injured his ankle and left early versus Juventus Utena. On April 25, Ball left Prienai with his family, with their father being critical of head coach Virginijus Šeškus. He finished the LKL season averaging 12.6 points and 2.7 rebounds per game, shooting 41.5% from the three-point line. Ball was not selected at the 2018 NBA draft.

Los Angeles Ballers (2018)
On July 9, 2018, Ball signed with the Los Angeles Ballers of the Junior Basketball Association, a league founded by his father as an alternative to college basketball. He joined in the middle of the season and made his debut on July 14, tallying 53 points, 10 rebounds, and 10 assists. Ball was named to the West roster for the JBA All-Star Game and was named co-MVP of the game after scoring 39 points. Ball recorded 39 points, 15 rebounds, 7 assists, and 3 steals in a 202–189 win to claim the All-Star Game MVP award. In his first playoff game, he scored a season-high 58 points in a 157–134 win over the Philadelphia Ballers. On August 12, Ball matched his season high of 58 points, 11 rebounds, and 6 assists in a Finals victory over the Seattle Ballers and was subsequently named Finals MVP. At the end of the season, Ball was among 14 players in the league named to the JBA USA select Team, which faced several European teams on an international tour.

Greensboro Swarm (2021–present)
In July 2019, Ball underwent surgery for an ankle injury and missed the NBA Summer League. On December 29, he signed with the Oklahoma City Blue of the NBA G League as a practice player. On March 9, 2020, he signed with the Blue by waiver claim. The Blue played just one game, which Ball did not play in, before the remainder of the season was cancelled due to the COVID-19 pandemic.

On December 2, 2020, Ball was signed to a training camp contract by the Detroit Pistons. On December 13, 2020, he was waived without playing in a pre-season game.

In the summer of 2021, Ball was invited by his brother LaMelo to workout with his team, the Charlotte Hornets. The Hornets allowed their players to bring in one workout partner. The Charlotte staff was impressed observing Ball, and he earned a spot on their Summer League team. In his summer league debut, he had five 3-pointers in 16 minutes. On October 14, 2021, Ball was signed by the Hornets. However, he was waived the next day.

On October 23, 2021, Ball was selected by the Greensboro Swarm 14th overall in the 2021 NBA G League draft. He scored 22 points in his G League debut.

Ball joined the Charlotte Hornets for the 2022 NBA Summer League. On September 26, 2022, Ball signed a non-guaranteed contract with the Hornets. He was waived on October 15, 2022.

On October 23, 2022, Ball rejoined the Greensboro Swarm roster for training camp.

Personal life
Ball's older brother, Lonzo, is a point guard for the Chicago Bulls and was the second-overall pick in the 2017 draft, while his younger brother LaMelo is a point guard for the Charlotte Hornets and was drafted third-overall in the 2020 draft. His cousin, Andre Ball, played college basketball for Pepperdine.

References

External links
 

1998 births
Living people
21st-century African-American sportspeople
African-American basketball players
American expatriate basketball people in Lithuania
American men's basketball players
Ball family
Basketball players from Anaheim, California
BC Prienai players
Chino Hills High School alumni
Greensboro Swarm players
Junior Basketball Association players
People from Chino Hills, California
Shooting guards
Small forwards